The Pakistan Army Medical Corps, Urdu: ﺁرمى مڈيكل كور; Army Medical Corps, abbreviated as the AMC  and popularly known as Medical Corps, is a military administrative combatant staff corps, and a primary military medical command of the Pakistan Army. Initially part of the Indian Army Medical Corps, it was born in 1947 and  served since Pakistan's independence in 1947. It is a vital part of Pakistan Army, serving in a support and military medical role. The corps also has a secondary role of providing civil services in health, rehabilitation and disaster relief to the wider Pakistan community.

Mission

Induction
1. Medical cadets from Army Medical College  CMH Lahore Medical College, CMH Karachi (Malir) medical college, CMH Multan Medical College and CMH Quetta Medical College after completion of basic military training at Pakistan Military Academy join this corps.

2. The civil medical college graduated students / specialists are also inducted into Army Medical Corps. Divided into two categories, SSRC and PTC, they undergo basic military training at AMC School and Centre Abbotabad for 22 weeks and 12 weeks respectively.

3. Female medical cadets from Army Medical College train for 22 weeks in AFPGMI. The same goes for the female civil medical college graduated students / specialists.

4. Soldiers in nursing and other trades of Army Medical Corps cadre undergo their basic military training and nursing classes at AMC centre Abottabad and subsequent professional courses at AFPGMI.

Aims and objectives
Besides their primary role in serving the Pakistan Army both in battle and in the conditions of peace, the Pakistan Army Medical Corps undertakes the following peace time activities:
 Provision of health services to the civilian community through a vast chain of Combined Military Hospitals (CMHs);
 Combating situations of disaster by providing rehabilitation services; and
 Establishing "health centers" in remote locations so that all Pakistanis can reach health facilities easily.

History
Before the First World War, the men of the Indian Army depended on their regimental hospitals for their medical treatment. In October 1918, Station Hospitals were sanctioned for the Indian troops to help improve the provision of services. The Indian Hospital Corps (IHC) was initially divided into ten Division Companies, which corresponded to the ten existing Military Divisions in India and Burma. They were located at Peshawar, Rawalpindi, Lahore, Quetta, Mhow, Poona, Meerut, Lucknow, Secunderabad and Rangoon. After the independence of Pakistan in 1947, the Pakistan Army raised its own medical corps.

Since then the Pakistan Army Medical Corps has provided services in the majority of health related fields. In the past personnel were taken from Army Medical College in Rawalpindi, but with the need of more health professionals in the army as well as an increased demand for their services, the corps has begun to recruit civilians medical personnel, who then attend short military courses.

Combined Military Hospitals
Combined Military Hospitals (CMHs) are the base hospitals of the Pakistan Armed Forces, which are situated in various cantonments. These hospitals are run by the doctors of Pakistan's Army Medical Corps. The administration is carried out by the General Duty Medical Officers (GDMOs) while the patients' management and care is primarily the responsibility of the doctors of specialist cadre.

The CMHs are categorized into three major parts depending on their functions, governing and physical body and role as Class 'A', Class 'B' and Class 'C' Hospitals.

Class 'A' hospitals
CMH Abbottabad
CMH Rawalpindi
CMH Kharian
CMH Lahore
CMH Peshawar
CMH Multan
CMH Quetta
CMH Malir Cantonment Karachi
CMH Hyderabad
CMH Pano Aqil

Class 'B' hospitals
CMH Gujranwala
CMH Sargodha
CMH Jhelum
CMH Sialkot
CMH Nowshera
CMH Muzaffarabad
CMH Kohat

Class 'C' hospitals
CMH Attock
CMH Bannu
CMH Chorre
CMH Thall
CMH Bahawalpur
CMH Mailsi
CMH Sibi
CMH Khuzdar
CMH Murree
CMH Zhob
CMH Skardu
CMH D I Khan
CMH Tarbela
CMH Gilgit
CMH Mardan
CMH Mangla
CMH Risalpur
CMH Rawalakot
CMH Chunian
CMH Bahawalnagar
CMH Okara

United Nations and the Pakistan Army Medical Corps
The Pakistan Army Medical Corps is one of the largest contributors of health services to United Nations. Since 1960 Pakistan has been actively involved in most of the UN peacekeeping, rehabilitation and health providing missions and today stands at the top with 10,175 troops and observers serving in current missions. The Pakistan Army Medical Corps is a major part of it. Some of the largest contributions have been in Somalia, Sierra Leone, Bosnia, Congo and Liberia.
In the wake of the new world power equilibrium a more complex security environment has emerged. It is characterised by growing national power politics and state implosions which have necessitated involvement of the United Nations peace keeping forces for conflict resolution.

The United Nations has been undertaking peace keeping operations since its inception, but the need for employment of peace keeping forces has increased significantly since the Gulf War. In 1992 there were 11,000 Blue Berets deployed around the world; by the end of the year the figure rose to 52,000. Presently it exceeds 80,000 troops.

 UN Operation in Congo (ONUC) 1960–1964
 UN Security Force in New Guinea, West Irian (UNSF) 1962–1963
 UN Yemen Observer Mission Yemen (UNYOM) 1963–1964
 UN Transition Assistance Group in Namibia (UNTAG) 1989–1990
 UN Iraq–Kuwait Observer Mission (UNIKOM) 1991–2003
 UN Mission in Haiti (UNMIH) 1993–1996
 UN Transitional Authority in Cambodia (UNTAC) 1992–1993
 UN Operations in Somalia (UNOSOM) 1992–1995
 UN Protection Forces in Bosnia (UNPROFOR) 1992–1995
 UN Observer Mission for Rwanda (UNAMIR) 1993–1996
 UN Verification Mission in Angola (UNAVEM III) 1995–1997
 UN Transitional Administration for Eastern Slavonia (UNTAES) 1996–1997
 UN Mission of Observers in Prevlaka (UNMOP) 1996–2002
 UN Assistance Mission in Sierra Leone (UNAMSIL) 2001–2005
 UN Transitional Administration in East Timor (UNTAET) 1999-to-date

The table below shows the current deployment of Pakistani Forces in UN Peacekeeping missions.

 The total number of troops serving currently in peacekeeping missions is 10,173 (as of March 2007).

National relief works

In times of natural disaster, such as the great floods of 1992 or the devastating October 2005 earthquake, army engineers, medical and logistics personnel, and the armed forces have played a major role in bringing relief and supplies.

The army has also engaged in extensive corporate activities.  Most of these enterprises, such as stud and dairy farms, were for the army's own use, but others, such as bakeries, security services and banking, perform functions in the local civilian economy.  Army factories have produced such goods as sugar, fertilizer, and brass castings which have then been sold to civilian consumers, albeit at prices higher than those charged from military personnel.

Several army organizations operate in the commercial sector across the country. For example, the National Logistics Cell was responsible for trucking food and other goods across the country; the Frontier Works Organization built the Karakorum Highway to China; and the Special Communication Organization maintained communications networks in remote parts of Pakistan.

The Pakistan Army has been involved in relief activities not only in Pakistan but also in many other countries of the world, such as the relief activities after Bangladesh was recently hit by floods. The Army also dispatched relief to Indonesia, Bangladesh and Sri Lanka after they were hit by the 2004 Indian Ocean earthquake and the resulting tsunami. Both the Pakistan Army and Navy sent ships and helicopters to assist in the tsunami relief operation.

The Army Medical Corps are responsible for providing medical facilities and organizing free medical camps in under privileged tribal areas such as the Federally Administered Tribal Areas in the North-West Frontier Province (now Khyber Pakhtunkhwa). The medical corps provided health-care facilities to more than 12,000 people affected by the 2010 floods in Pakistan.

Army doctors and international disasters
 Pakistan Army provided humanitarian assistance to the community in the form of daily free medical treatment at Tubmanburg and the medical outreach initiatives in 2008.
 Pakistan Army Field Hospital which was deployed at Bhandaria, Barisal, Bangladesh for relief operations after Cyclone "Sidr" worked day and night to mitigate the suffering of the flood affected people earning goodwill for Pakistan.
 Pakistan Field Hospital has been established at Lamno, which is the District Headquarters of Aceh Jaya. Lamno is 80 km South West of Bande Aceh.
 Pakistan Army Field Hospital which proceeded to Indonesia to carry out relief and rescue operation had treated thousands of patients since their arrival on in earthquake hit areas of District Klaten in Central Java in Indonesia.

Units 

 4 Medical Battalion
 44 Medical Battalion
 61 Medical Battalion
 64 Medical Battalion
 66 Medical Battalion
 70 Medical Battalion
 71 Medical Battalion
 72 Medical Battalion
 74 Medical Battalion

 77 Medical Battalion
 78 Medical Battalion
 123 Medical Battalion
 130 Medical Battalion
 134 Medical Battalion
 136 Medical Battalion
 137 Medical Battalion
 144 Medical Battalion
 173 Medical Battalion

Mountain units 
 1 Mountain Medical Battalion
 2 Mountain Medical Battalion
 3 Mountain Medical Battalion
 4 Mountain Medical Battalion
 5 Mountain Medical Battalion

See also
 Military Hospital Rawalpindi
 Pakistan Army
 Pakistan Army Corps of Engineers
 Abbottabad

References

External links
 Official website

M
Pakistan M
M
M